Silver Bird was a motorcycle land-speed record setting streamliner motorcycle. It was powered by two motors delivering .

Construction

The motorcycle was built by Don Vesco and sponsored by Yamaha.  It had two four-cylinder, 694.9 cc reed-valve two-stroke engines from the Yamaha TZ750 racebike.

Specifications
Displacement: 1,389.8 cc total
Engine bore and stroke: 64mm×54mm
Dimensions: 21 feet long, 32 inches high
Weight: c.

References

Notes

Sources

Further reading

External links

Motorcycles of the United States
Land speed record motorcycles
Feet forwards motorcycles
Streamliner motorcycles
Motorcycles designed by Don Vesco